La Cuesta is a district of the Corredores canton, in the Puntarenas province of Costa Rica.

History 
La Cuesta was created on 19 October 1973 by Ley 5373. Segregated from Golfito canton.

Geography 
La Cuesta has an area of  km² and an elevation of  metres.

Demographics 

For the 2011 census, La Cuesta had a population of  inhabitants.

Transportation

Road transportation 
The district is covered by the following road routes:
 National Route 238
 National Route 614

References 

Districts of Puntarenas Province
Populated places in Puntarenas Province